Lisa Jacobs may refer to:
Lisa Jacobs (actress), British actor
Lisa Jacobs (cyclist), Australian cyclo-cross cyclist
Lisa Jacobs (violinist), Dutch violinist
Lisa Jacobs, part of Jocelyn & Lisa, Canadian musical duo